The 99 Call are a British band formed in 2009 by Paul Anderson, previously from Tram and Clive Painter from Broken Dog. 
They performed their first show in Rimini, Italy in July 2009 playing some new material and songs from the Tram album Heavy Black Frame in celebration of its tenth anniversary. The 99 Call have recorded soundtracks for several short films.
They subsequently released their first single called 'Last Days' on Setanta Records in 2010.  Followed by a mini album called 'Spanish Flies' on Moonpalace Records which featured Martin Medina on piano and trumpet.

Members
Paul Anderson
Clive Painter

References

English rock music groups
Musical groups from London
Musical groups established in 2009
2009 establishments in England